The Battle of Athens was fought in Athens, Alabama (Limestone County, Alabama), on January 26, 1864, as part of the American Civil War. The Union force was a company under Captain Emil Adams from the 9th Illinois Mounted Infantry regiment. The Confederate force was the 1st Alabama Cavalry, under Lieutenant Colonel Moses W. Hannon.

On the morning of January 26, 1864, at around 4:00 a.m., ~700 Confederate cavalrymen attacked Athens, which was being held by a Union force of only 150. Even though the Union defenders had no fortifications and were outnumbered six to one, they were able to repulse the Confederate attack and force them into a retreat after a two-hour battle.

References

External links 
 National Park Service battle description

Battle of Athens
Athens 1864
Athens 1864
Athens 1964
Battle of Athens
Conflicts in 1864
January 1864 events